André Gonçalves Dias, or simply André Dias (born 15 May 1979) is a retired Brazilian football central defender.

Club career
Born in São Bernardo do Campo, André Dias first entered senior football in the 1999 Copa São Paulo de Juniores, when he played for Palestra de São Bernardo. In the same year, Dias was signed by Paraná, where he played for a year before moving to a bigger side, Flamengo. Dias stayed with Flamengo only for a short time, making ten appearances before moving again, this time to Paysandu Sport Club. Following a year at Paysandu, the defender moved to Goiás, where he established himself as a strong and talented defender.

In 2005, after two seasons at Goiás, Dias moved to play for São Paulo. He remained there until the end of the 2009 season.

Lazio
Dias secured a move to Europe on 1 February 2010, when he signed for Italian club Lazio for €2.63 million. He made 12 Serie A appearances with them in his first season and scored two quality goals.

2011–12 was the season that consolidated Dias as a pivotal part of the Lazio defence. The Brazilian centre back coupled with Biava and Diakite and guided Lazio's defence to good success and also scored 2 goals in this season.

2012–13 season has seen Dias once again as one of the protagonists of Lazio's surge to the top positions of the table. Under new Lazio coach Vladimir Petkovic, Dias has become a backbone of the squad and together with Biava and Ciani, has formed a formidable defence, being one of the best in Serie A.

In December 2013, after almost four years playing in Italy, Dias, under permission of Lazio, can accept proposals from Brazil. Thus, the defender, in some months – Besides of this, his contract with Italians also finishes in July 2014 – can come back to his country. Dias desires to play again in Brazil to staying close to his family, and said that he does not have a preferred club to continue his career, even having a great identification with his former team São Paulo FC.

International career
In 2009, Dias was called up to the Brazilian national side by the manager Dunga, to face Chile in a 2010 World Cup qualifier. He did not make his debut, however.

Career statistics

Honours

Club
São Paulo
Brazilian League: 2006, 2007, 2008

Lazio
Coppa Italia: 2012–13

Individual
 Bola de Prata: 2008, 2009
 Campeonato Brasileiro Série A Team of the Year: 2009

References

1979 births
Living people
People from São Bernardo do Campo
Brazilian footballers
Association football defenders
Campeonato Brasileiro Série A players
Serie A players
São Paulo FC players
Paraná Clube players
CR Flamengo footballers
Paysandu Sport Club players
Goiás Esporte Clube players
S.S. Lazio players
Brazilian expatriate footballers
Expatriate footballers in Italy
Brazilian expatriate sportspeople in Italy
Footballers from São Paulo (state)

ar:اندريه دياز